Selous is the Anglicised form of the Dutch name Slous. It may refer to:

People
 Andrew Selous (born 1962), British politician
 Edmund Selous (1857–1934), British ornithologist and writer
 Frederick Selous (1851–1917), British explorer and big-game hunter
 Henry Courtney Selous (1803–1890), British painter

Other
 Selous Game Reserve, Tanzania
 Selous Scouts, the special forces of the Rhodesian Army
 Selous, Zimbabwe
 Selous' mongoose, (Paracynictis selousi)
 Selous' zebra (Equus quagga selousi)